Dante (real name Jay Dante Rusciolelli; born October 2, 1970) is an American comedian, talent agent and activist from Ridgecrest, California. Dante is the youngest of four children. In 1982, Dante and his parents moved to San Diego where he attended Patrick Henry High School.

On November 24, 2018, he married his long time girlfriend and business partner Rebekah Kochan. 

Dante starred in the 1996 BET sitcom The Blackberry Inn.  In 2007, he appeared in season 5 of Last Comic Standing on NBC, and was eliminated in episode 7, the first of seven elimination episodes.

Dante ran for mayor of Los Angeles in 2001.

References

External links

1970 births
American male comedians
Entertainers from California
Last Comic Standing contestants
People from Ridgecrest, California

Living people
Comedians from California
21st-century American comedians